Pudding Norton is a village and civil parish in the English county of Norfolk.
For the purposes of local government, it falls within the district of North Norfolk.

The villages name means 'North farm/settlement'. The origins of the affix 'Pudding' are obscure.

Pudding Norton civil parish contains the villages of Pudding Norton and Testerton, both of which became largely deserted by the Post-medieval period. Pudding Norton village sits at the centre of the parish, and earthworks to the south and east show the previous medieval extent of the village.

Buildings
Only two buildings of architectural interest remain. The first, the church of Saint Margaret, retains just the walls of its west tower and part of the west end of the nave. It was constructed in flint and limestone, and is thought to date to the 12th and 13th centuries.

The second is the Grade II Listed Pudding Norton Hall, a building initially built in the 17th century, reconstructed in the 18th and 19th centuries, and since developed into a farmhouse.

Of possible interest is an hexagonal pillbox (sometimes referred to as a blockhouse) and possible gun emplacement dating to the Second World War and situated just west of the village of Testerton.

Notes

References
Morris, J. (General Editor), (1984). Domesday Book, 33 Norfolk, Part I and Part II, Chichester: Phillimore & Co
Pevsner, N. and Wilson, B. (1999). The Buildings of England. Norfolk 2: North-West and South, London: Penguin Books.
A Vision of Britain Through Time: Pudding Norton CP by H. Southall, retrieved 7 December 2006
UK & Ireland Genealogy page on Pudding Norton by Pat Newby, retrieved 8 December 2006
Norfolk Churches: St Margaret, Pudding Norton by Simon Knott, retrieved 8 December 2006

External links

Villages in Norfolk
Civil parishes in Norfolk
North Norfolk